Johnny 99 is the 69th album by American country singer Johnny Cash, released on Columbia Records in 1983. It is notable for including two covers of Bruce Springsteen songs, "Highway Patrolman" and "Johnny 99".  "I'm Ragged but I'm Right," a George Jones song, was a minor hit, reaching No. 75. Johnny 99 is generally regarded as a strong release at a point in Cash's career which is considered to be the least successful; it was also the second-to-last solo album released by Cash on Columbia, prior to his move to Mercury Records. Hoyt Axton sings background on "Highway Patrolman" and "Joshua Gone Barbados". "New Cut Road" had been a relatively successful single for Bobby Bare in 1981; Paul Kennerley's "Brand New Dance" would go on to be covered, among others, by Emmylou Harris on her 1990 album of the same name.

Several of the songs on Johnny 99 contain political or social themes and commentary: the title track tells the story of a disgruntled former automobile plant employee who turns to crime after encountering serious financial difficulties; "God Bless Robert E. Lee" praises the Confederacy's most famous general for managing to prevent unnecessary loss of human life in the war-torn South by surrendering to the Union at Appomattox Court House; "Joshua Gone Barbados" deals with a sugarcane-cutters' strike on Saint Vincent turned violent; "Highway Patrolman", in turn, discusses a troubled relationship between the title character and his alcoholic, violent brother.

Track listing

Personnel
 Johnny Cash - vocals, acoustic guitar
 James Burton - electric guitar
 Bob Wootton - electric guitar
 Jerry Scheff - bass guitar
 Hal Blaine - drums
 Glen D. Hardin - keyboards
 Brian Ahern - gut-string guitar, 6-string bass, tambourine, arrangements
 Tim Goodman - electric guitar, acoustic guitar, slide guitar, 6-string bass, banjo
 Nick DeCaro - accordion 
 Jo-El Sonnier - accordion
 David Mansfield - mandolin, mandocello, fiddle
 Marty Stuart - electric and acoustic guitar, mandolin
 Norton Buffalo - harmonica
 Hoyt Axton, Barbara Bennett, Donivan Cowart, Lynn Langham - vocals
 June Carter - vocals on "Brand New Dance"
Technical
Jack Grochmal, Donivan Cowart, Brian Ahern - engineer
John Seakwood - photography

Charts
Singles - Billboard (United States)

References

External links
 Luma Electronic entry on Johnny 99

Johnny Cash albums
1983 albums
Albums produced by Brian Ahern (producer)
Columbia Records albums
Cultural depictions of Robert E. Lee